Bonfire Night is a traditional celebration involving bonfires in several countries.

Specifically, Bonfire Night may refer to:
 Guy Fawkes Night, in Great Britain and some Commonwealth nations (5 November)
 Halloween or Hallowe'en (a contraction of "All Hallows' evening"), a celebration observed in many countries, on 31 October, the eve of the Western Christian feast of All Hallows' Day, corresponding to the Celtic festival of Samhain
 Saint John's Eve (23 June) or St John's Night (24 June), in many countries
 Eleventh Night, in Northern Ireland (11 July)
 Aggie Bonfire, also called "Student Bonfire", Texas A&M University, United States  (November)
 Chaharshanbe Suri, ancient Zoroastrian fire-jumping festival as a prelude to the start of the spring season, celebrated by Persian, Azerbaijani, and Kurdish people (March)